John Clayton Nienstedt (born March 18, 1947) is an American prelate of the Roman Catholic Church. He served as the eighth archbishop of the Archdiocese of St. Paul and Minneapolis in Minnesota from 2008 to 2015. He previously served as bishop of the Diocese of New Ulm in Minnesota from 2001 to 2007 and as an auxiliary bishop of the Archdiocese of Detroit from 1996 to 2001.

Nienstadt asked for early retirement as archbishop of St. Paul and Minneapolis after a local prosecutor announced plans to indict the archdiocese due to its failure to protect children from sexual abuse by its priests.

Biography

Early life 
John Nienstedt was born pm March 18, 1947, in Detroit, Michigan, to John C. and Elizabeth S. (née Kennedy) Nienstedt. The second oldest of six children, he has two brothers, Richard and Michael, and three sisters, Barbara, Mary, and Corinne.

Nienstedt graduated in 1969 from Sacred Heart Major Seminary in Detroit with Bachelor of Arts degree.  He then studied Pontifical Gregorian University in Rome, where he earned a Bachelor of Sacred Theology degree in 1972.  On April 29, 1972, Nienstedt was ordained a deacon at the Pontifical North American College.

Priesthood 
Nienstedt was ordained a priest by Bishop Joseph Imesch on July 27, 1974, for the Archdiocese of Detroit in the United States. He then served as an associate pastor at Guardian Angels Parish in Clawson, Michigan, until 1976. He received a Licentiate of Sacred Theology from the Pontifical Institute of St. Alphonsus in 1977. After returning to Detroit in 1977, Nienstedt became priest-secretary to Cardinal John Dearden and a part-time professor of moral theology at St. John's Provincial Seminary in Plymouth, Michigan.  

Nienstedt accompanied Cardinal Dearden to the August 1978 papal conclave in Rome, where he met the future Pope John Paul II. Nienstedt was also a weekend associate pastor at St. Fabian's Parish in Farmington Hills and at Our Lady of Sorrows Parish in Farmington, both in Michigan. He became vicar general for the archdiocese in 1979.

In 1980, Nienstedt returned to Rome, where he was assigned to the English desk of the Vatican Secretariat of State. While in Rome, he also served as a chaplain at Bambino Gesù Hospital (1980–83) and to the Brothers of Holy Cross (1981–84). Nienstedt earned a Doctorate in Sacred Theology from the Pontifical Institute of St. Alphonsus in 1985; his doctoral thesis was entitled, "Human Life in a Test-tube; the Moral Dimension of In Vitro Fertilization and Embryo transfer."

In early 1986, Nienstedt came back to Michigan.  He was named temporary assistant pastor at St. Regis Parish in Birmingham, Michigan, and adjunct professor of moral theology at SS. Cyril and Methodius Seminary in Orchard Lake, Michigan. He was named pastor of St. Patrick's Parish in Union Lake, Michigan in July that year. In 1987, Nienstedt was appointed to reorganize  Sacred Heart Seminary. He became its rector in 1988. He was named as an honorary prelate of his holiness in 1990 and pastor of the National Shrine of the Little Flower in Royal Oak, Michigan, in 1994.

Auxiliary Bishop of Detroit 
On June 12, 1996, Nienstedt was appointed auxiliary bishop of the Archdiocese of Detroit and titular bishop of Alton by Pope John Paul II. He received his episcopal consecration on July 9, 1996, from Cardinal Adam Maida, with Cardinals James Hickey and Edmund Szoka serving as co-consecrators. He selected as his episcopal motto: , 'That All May Be One' from John 17:21.

As an auxiliary bishop, Nienstedt served as episcopal vicar for the Dearborn, Downriver, Monroe, Northwest Wayne, Southland, and Western Wayne vicariates.

Bishop of New Ulm 
Nienstedt was named as the third bishop of the Diocese of New Ulm on June 12, 2001, and was installed on August 6. He denounced the more progressive views of his predecessor, Bishop Raymond Lucker, told Catholics not to read Lucker's book as representing Catholic doctrine, and asked the United States Conference of Catholic Bishops (USCCB) to assess the validity of his views.

During his tenure at the USCCB, Nienstedt chaired the Committee on Priestly Formation and was a member of the Ad Hoc Committee on Health Care Issues and the Church in the United States Conference of Catholic Bishops. Both Nienstedt's parents died in the course of six weeks in the winter of 2007.

Coadjutor Archbishop and Archbishop of St. Paul and Minneapolis 
On April 24, 2007, Pope Benedict XVI appointed Nienstedt as coadjutor archbishop of the Archdiocese of St. Paul and Minneapolis, the designated successor to Archbishop Harry Flynn.

When the pope accepted Flynn's retirement on May 2, 2008, Nienstedt automatically succeeded him as the eighth archbishop of St. Paul and Minneapolis. Nienstedt received the pallium, a vestment worn by metropolitan bishops, from Pope Benedict in St. Peter's Basilica on June 29, 2008. Shortly after becoming archbishop, Nienstedt discontinued the gay pride prayer service held at St. Joan of Arc Church in Minneapolis. He declined numerous invitations to attend the 2008 Republican National Convention, which was held in St. Paul.

In October 2010, Nienstedt announced a strategic plan that called for 21 parishes to be merged into 14 neighboring parishes. These and two layer mergers reduced the number of parishes in the archdiocese from 213 in October 2010 to 188 in July 2013. The mergers involve parishes across the archdiocese.

Personal misconduct allegations against Nienstedt  
The archdiocese announced on December 17, 2013, that Nienstedt had voluntarily "stepped aside from all public ministry".  The day before, Ramsey County authorities launched an investigation into an allegation that in 2009 Nienstedt had touched a boy on the buttocks.  This allegedly happened during a photo session with the boy after a confirmation ceremony. After receiving the complaint, the archdiocese encouraged the young man to contact the police. Nienstedt maintained that this allegation was "absolutely and entirely false."

In February 2014, with Nienstedt's approval, the archdiocese hired an outside law firm to investigate allegations of sexual misconduct against seminarians and other young men.  The allegations were initiated by Jennifer Haselberger, the archdiocesan canon law official.  On March 11, 2014, Ramsey County officials announced they had concluded an "intensive investigation" of the touching allegation and would not file charges against Nienstedt, citing insufficient evident.  Nienstedt immediately announced his return to public ministry.

In July 2014, the archdiocese publicly revealed its investigation of Nienstedt. Nienstedt responded, saying "I have never engaged in sexual misconduct and certainly have not made any sexual advances toward anyone. ... The allegations do not involve minors or lay members of the faithful, and they do not implicate any kind of illegal or criminal behavior."

Sexual abuse allegations against priests 
Nienstedt was criticized in 2014 for the way "his diocese has dealt with sexually abusive priests". Nienstedt responded, writing in a diocesan publication that although "it is very clear that we did not handle all complaints the way we should have in the past ... I have never knowingly covered up clergy sexual abuse [and] I promise to make changes".

Six archdiocesan priests publicly criticized Nienstedt's handling of the allegations, with some calling for his resignation. Nienstedt said that he would only resign if the papal nuncio took action. In 2014, during a lawsuit against the archdiocese, Nienstedt testified about his knowledge of priests accused of child sexual abuse.

LeVan case 
In an April 2, 2014, deposition, Nienstedt claimed to have been unaware until March 2014 that Kenneth LaVan, a priest in the archdiocese, was still in ministry.  In 1988, the archdiocese had received accusations that LaVan had sexually assaulted a teenage girl and was guilty of "sexually exploiting" several women.  His continued ministry was a violation of church policy.

Despite Nienstedt's denials, court documents showed that he had received several updates over the years on LaVan's pastoral work.  Nienstedt received the last update on August 15, 2013, and afterwards approved LaVan's continued parish assignments. The documents also indicated that Nienstedt had socialized with LaVan, as recently as June 2013, thanking him in a letter for a gift of Wild Turkey bourbon at a social gathering.

Gustafson case 
Nienstedt also testified in 2014 that he first learned of the criminal conviction of the Gilbert Gustafson, another archdiocesan priest, "during the last six months".  Nienstedt claimed to have little knowledge of him. Gustafson had been convicted in 1983 of sexually assaulting a boy in White Bear Lake, Minnesota over a period of several years; he was fined and spent several months in prison.

Minnesota Public Radio in October 2014 reported that LaLonne Murphy, a parish music director, had written to Nienstedt in 2008 about Gustafson's criminal record and his continued work with the archdiocese.  A written response from Nienstedt said that he had no control over Gustafson as he was no longer a priest.  In reality, Gusfason had not been laicized.

Resignation 

On June 5, 2015,  Ramsey County prosecutor John J. Choi announced that he was bringing criminal charges and initiating a civil suit against the archdiocese for failing to protect children from sexual abuse.  Choi alleged "a disturbing institutional and systemic pattern of behavior committed by the highest levels of leadership of the Archdiocese of St. Paul and Minneapolis over the course of decades". Soon after Choi's announcement, Nienstedt submitted his resignation as archbishop of St. Paul and Minneapolis to the pope.

Since Nienstedt was several years under the mandatory retirement age of 75 for archbishops, he invoked provision of canon law that allows a bishop to resign when some "grave reason" makes it impossible to continue to fulfill his duties. Pope Francis accepted Nienstedt's resignation on June 15, 2015.  Nienstedt issued a statement that said he resigned "with a clear conscience knowing that my team and I have put in place solid protocols to ensure the protection of minors and vulnerable adults."

Pope Francis named Bernard Hebda, coadjutor archbishop of the Archdiocese of Newark, to serve as the archdiocese's apostolic administrator; Hebda was appointed archbishop on March 24, 2016.

After resignation 
After his resignation as archbishop of St. Paul and Minneapolis, Nienstedt returned to Michigan, where he has a home on Lake Huron. In 2016, he served briefly as substitute priest in the Diocese of Kalamazoo, but quit after only a week due to objections from local parishioners in Battle Creek. Nienstedt moved again in 2016 to Napa Valley, California, where he worked as an independent contractor for the Napa Institute, editing conference proceedings for publication. He also participated in their annual conference. On August 15, 2018, the Institute announced that Nienstedt had "stepped aside" from his responsibilities, and that it was understood that the Institute had been advised that "there are no restrictions on Archbishop Nienstedt’s ministry".

In July 2016, documents related to the investigation by the diocese into Nienstedt were released. He retains his status as an archbishop.

Positions on public issues 
Nienstedt has stated that Satan is behind sodomy, abortion, contraception, pornography and same-sex marriage.

LBGT rights 
Nienstedt has described homosexuality as a "result of psychological trauma" that "must be understood in the context of other human disorders: envy, malice, greed, etc." In 2005, Nienstedt warned that the film Brokeback Mountain was part of a so-called agenda that "severs the connection between marriage and gender". He summarized the plot–"one man makes a pass at the other and within seconds the latter mounts the former in an act of wanton anal sex"–and called it "a story of lust gone bad".

In October 2012, Nienstedt used more than US$600,000 in archdiocesan funds to campaign for Minnesota Amendment 1, which would have banned same-sex marriage in the state.  The initiative was defeated at the polls on November 6, 2012, by five percentage points. Nienstedt opposed legislation legalizing same-sex marriage, which became law on May 14, 2013.

Abortion 
During the 2008 U.S. presidential election, Nienstedt criticized House Speaker Nancy Pelosi, saying she had a "misinterpretation on the question of when life begins" and that her "remarks underscore once again the need for Catholics, and especially Catholic politicians, to form their consciences according to the moral truths taught by the Catholic Church." He also criticized the Freedom of Choice Act, saying, "It is hard to imagine a more radical piece of pro-abortion legislation." He opposes embryonic stem cell research involving discarded human embryo stem cell lines.

Euthanasia 
In 2005, while discussing the Terri Schiavo right-to-die case, Nienstedt stated,"Her case demonstrates the disparity that exists in this country between laws and basic moral principles. While we cannot legislate morality, we ought not to be legislating immorality."

References

External links
 Roman Catholic Archdiocese of Saint Paul and Minneapolis Official Site
 Article from the Pioneer Press
 Article from MPR
 

1947 births
Living people
Clergy from Detroit
21st-century Roman Catholic archbishops in the United States
Roman Catholic bishops of New Ulm
Roman Catholic archbishops of Saint Paul and Minneapolis
Pontifical North American College alumni
Pontifical Gregorian University alumni
Catholic Church sexual abuse scandals in the United States
Ecclesiastical passivity to Catholic sexual abuse cases
Roman Catholic Archdiocese of Detroit
Sacred Heart Major Seminary faculty
Religious leaders from Michigan